Darren Abram (born 27 September 1967) is a rugby league footballer who played in the 1980s and 1990s, and coached in the 2000s.

Darren Abram played, and score a try in the Rochdale Hornets 14-24 defeat by St. Helens in the 1991 Lancashire County Cup Final during the 1991–92 season at Wilderspool Stadium, Warrington, on Sunday 20 October 1991.

Abram cut his coaching teeth with Chorley Lynx in National League Two and was taken on by the Leigh Centurions, with a view to taking them into the Super League, in October 2003. He accomplished this in his first season as Leigh Centurions beat Whitehaven in a dramatic National League One Grand Final. Leigh Centurions' Super League season of 2005, however, proved a disaster and the club were relegated after winning just two games, with Abram leaving in August 2005. He was appointed Rochdale Hornets' coach in November 2005, as successor to Bobbie Goulding, who had resigned two weeks earlier. Abram parted company from Rochdale Hornets in July 2007.

Genealogical information
Darren Abram is the father of the rugby league  who has played in the 2010s and 2020s for Barrow Raiders, Rochdale Hornets and Oldham; Dan Abram.

References

External links
 (archived by web.archive.org) Statistics at orl-heritagetrust.org.uk
Search for "Darren Abram" at bbc.co.uk

1967 births
Living people
Blackpool Borough players
Chorley Lynx coaches
Chorley Lynx players
English rugby league players
Leigh Leopards coaches
Oldham R.L.F.C. players
Place of birth missing (living people)
Rochdale Hornets coaches
Rochdale Hornets players
Rugby league centres
Rugby league coaches
Swinton Lions players
Warrington Wolves players